Saeed Hajjarian (born 1954) is an Iranian reformist political strategist, journalist, pro-democracy activist and former intelligence officer. He was a member of Tehran's city council, and advisor to president Mohammad Khatami. On 12 March 2000, he was shot in the face by an assailant and severely disabled, an act many Iranians believe was in retaliation for his help in uncovering the chain murders of Iran and his significant help to the Iranian reform movement in general, according to the BBC.

Early life and education
Hajjarian was born in Javadiyeh neighborhood of Tehran, Iran in 1954 to parents from Kashan. He studied mechanical engineering at Tehran University. In 1977 Hajjarian was enrolled for military service in Gendarmerie. A young Iranian revolutionary during the 1979 Iranian Revolution, he entered the Islamic Revolution Committees before becoming an Intelligence officer in Navy. Hajjarian continued his education and obtained a PhD in political science from Tehran University. His thesis advisor was Hossein Bashiriyeh. He was one of the students who took over the US embassy in Tehran in 1979.

Career
After the revolution, Hajjarian was involved in the formation of the intelligence apparatus of the newly founded Islamic Republic. Through the 1980s, he worked in the ministry of intelligence, where his positions included vice minister for political affairs. In the late 1980s, he left the ministry, and established Center for Strategic Research under the presidency. That was where he played an important role in creating a new discourse based on democracy and rule of law for his generation of revolutionaries.

When Mohammad Khatami was elected president in 1997, he appointed Hajjarian his political advisor. In 1999, he was elected to the city council of Tehran in the first city elections after the 1979 revolution. Hajjarian was also the editor of Sobh-e Emrooz newspaper, which was a strong advocate of Khatami's reforms. He was believed to be the source of information for many articles written by the investigative journalists, Akbar Ganji and Emadeddin Baghi. These included stories about the "Chain murders" of dissident intellectuals by members of Iran's intelligence ministry.

Hajjarian was one of the personal key factors of president Khatami. He was a member of the reformist elite and has leadership support role in reform movement. He joined the ministry of intelligence and national security (MINS) in 1984 and he left it in 1989. He worked also in the center of strategic studies. Working in such a place, he was able to invite some of the officials of MINS to join the reform movement. All of them tried to develop the reform movement. People like Akbar Ganji, Mohsen Armin, Abbas Abdi, Hamid Reza Jalaeipour, Muhammad Mousavi Khouiniha, Ebrahim Asghar Zadeh and Mohsen Sazgaran are among those persons.

Assassination attempt 

In March, 2000 he was shot in the face by a gunman on the doorstep of Tehran's city council. The would-be assassin fled on a motorcycle with an accomplice. The bullet entered through his left cheek and lodged in his neck, and put Hajjarian into a coma. During this time, groups of young Iranians kept vigil outside Sina hospital, where he was being treated. Hajjarian was badly paralyzed for life.

His assailant, Saeed Asgar, a young man who was reported to be a member of the Basij militia, was later arrested and sentenced to spend 15 years in jail. However, he was released after spending only a short term in prison. Asgar was accompanied by Mohsen Morteza Majidi on a motorbike. Others, who were involved, include Mohammad Ali Moghaddami, Mehdi Rowghani, Mousa Jan Nesari, Ali Pourchaluei (possibly the one who shot Hajjarian), Saeed Golounani and Safar Maghsoudi.

Possible cause
His attempted assassination is thought to be associated with the exposure of the "Chain murders"  in his Sobh Emrouz daily newspaper, and the "key role" he is believed to have played "in bringing about ... damaging disclosures," both as the editor of the exposing newspaper and one of the few reformists likely to be a source of information about activity in the intelligence ministry. Consequently, "some believe that remnants" of the chain murder "intelligence killer group may have been" behind his attempted assassination.

Recovery
Hajjarian slowly recovered somewhat from the shooting. By 2005, Hajjarian was still unable to speak with a clear voice and still using the wheelchair, although could walk with help. As of 2009 he still spoke with difficulty and was "dependent on the constant care of doctors and family."

Research works and viewpoints 
Hajjarian has used the term “dual sovereignty” as an analytic tool to describe the balance of power in the Islamic Republic's government system, in which there is a supposed split between the Supreme Leader and popularly elected officials, e.g. the President. The idea has been publicly denounced by Ali Khamenei in 2004, being called "damaging and a deadly poison" repeated by "irrational people".

He believes that a frontal assault on the fortresses of power is impractical. Hajjarian argued that domination of politics by clerics was wrong, but could be gradually eroded by "mobilizing the masses and using them as bargaining chips with Iran's rulers." His strategy for the reform movement was described as extending the reformists "reach by triangulating between the mass movement they represented and the autocratic state with which they shared power. He coined the phrase that would define the reformists' strategy: “Pressure from below, negotiation at the top.” The strategy remarks that by developing civil society and winning the battle of public opinion, the reform movement can gain enough strength to not only resist the hardliners, but also push for deep changes within the system via bargains with top officials unwilling to reform.

Hajjarian formulated the proposed gradual move to a favorable democratic system as “fortress to fortress triumph”, meaning that reformers should concentrate on weakening and capturing key institutions, i.e. fortresses of power, one by one.

Hajjarian argued that there is a way of combating the predominance of Valiyat al-faqih (rule of the Islamic jurist) by underlining the de facto secularization of religion by the supreme leader of the Islamic Republic, Khomeini. He allegedly showed the supremacy of politics as such over any religious norm when he said that the interests of the Islamic Republic are paramount in Islam and that zakat, salat, hajj, and everything else in Islam, are subordinate. This kind of decision, he states, means that politics are more important than religion and that this acknowledges the secularization of religion. In this context, he argues, it is possible to reassess velayat faqih and to reject its supremacy within the political field in Iran.

After reformists lost their "fortresses", Hajjarian said in 2004 that the reforms program have been failed and now there are multiple choices for the Iranian people. One option is giving up and accepting the current situation. Another choice is apathy, followed by adopting defeatism—waiting for a possible foreign military action against Iran and regime change— or to let the developing lumpenproletariat in the society grow until they ignite a revolution in Iran. Hajjarian prefers what he calls the best alternative, which is to assume “reforms is dead, long live the reforms” and continue the reforms path patiently.P

2009 elections
On 16 June 2009, four days after the disputed presidential election, it was reported that Hajjarian had been arrested. It was reported that he died in Evin prison under torture on 7 July. However, it was later added that he was still alive but had had a nervous breakdown on 8 July and was in critical condition in a military hospital in Tehran. Later, there were reports that he was still in Evin Prison, possibly in a clinic there, and that according to his wife, physician Vajiheh Marsoussi, his medical condition was "deteriorating severely" while in prison.

2015 speech
In May 2015, Hajjarian was allowed to give a short speech at University of Tehran. According to the reformist Shargh Daily, enthusiasm for the speech was so great that seats were filled up hours before the event. In a note he gave to a student to read, Hajjarian stated that the 1997 presidential election were the reformists prevailed were the first since the 1979 Iranian revolution in which there was "a competition", and that it "institutionalized" competition in the presidential elections, and introduced new debate on the issues of religion, economics and other foreign and domestic policies. But he believed those elections were an "exception" and doubtful of their repetition, "though he did not explain why", according to al-Monitor.

See also 

Abbas Amir-Entezam
Akbar Ganji
Gholamhossein Karbaschi
History of political Islam in Iran
Human rights in Islamic Republic of Iran
Iranian reform movement

References

External links

  A Recent (2005) interview with Hajjarian by Vaghaye Ettefaghieh
 BBC News story on Hajjarian assassination attempt
 Saeed Hajjarian newstag at IranHumanRights.org
 Tag: Saeed Hajjarian
 Interview: New book on basij helps explain how Iran's hardline faction keeps country captive - The Guardian
 Saeed Hajjarian - Aljazeera
 Al-Ahram Weekly story: Price of a reformist victory?
 Show Trials against Dissidents in Iran: Destruction of a Hero
  From Etelāʿāti to Eslāhtalabi: Saʿid Hajjarian, Political Theology and the Politics of Reform in Post-Revolutionary Iran, Eskandar Sadeghi-Boroujerdi, Iranian Studies, Volume 47, Issue 6, 2014

1954 births
Living people
University of Tehran alumni
Deputies of the Ministry of Intelligence (Iran)
Iranian reformists
Iranian writers
Iranian journalists
Iranian newspaper publishers (people)
History of the Islamic Republic of Iran
Iranian democracy activists
Islamic Iran Participation Front politicians
Shooting survivors
Vice Chairmen of City Council of Tehran
Tehran Councillors 1999–2003
Iranian political consultants
Presidential advisers of Iran
Islamic Revolution Committees personnel
Iranian politicians with disabilities
Iranian Gendarmerie personnel
Persian-language writers
Iranian critics